Scarth may refer to:

People
 Alice Scarth - writer
 Harry Mengden Scarth (1814 – 1890) clergyman and antiquarian
 W. B. Scarth -  (May 24, 1895 – March 9, 1983) Canadian businessman
 William Bain Scarth - (1837 - 1902) Canadian politician
 James Scarth Gale - translated bibles
 Jimmy Scarth (26 August 1926 – 12 December 2000) footballer
 Vera Scarth-Johnson, (1912 - 1999), botanist

Places

Canada
 Scarth, Manitoba

Other
  Scarth A.D. 2195 - Comic Strip